This article displays the qualifying draw of the 2011 e-Boks Sony Ericsson Open.

Players

Seeds

Qualifiers

Qualifying draw

First qualifier

Second qualifier

Third qualifier

Fourth qualifier

References
 Qualifying Draw

e-Boks Sony Ericsson Open - qualifying